Mary Tyler Mann ( Peabody; November 16, 1806 in Cambridgeport, Massachusetts – February 11, 1887 in Jamaica Plain, Massachusetts) was a teacher, author, and mother.  She was the wife of Horace Mann, American education reformer and politician.

Early life

Mary Tyler Peabody was the daughter of Nathaniel and Elizabeth Palmer Peabody. Her sisters were Elizabeth, reformer, educator, and pioneer in establishing kindergarten, and Sophia, painter and wife of Nathaniel Hawthorne. She had three brothers, Nathaniel Cranch Peabody, George Francis Peabody, and Wellington Peabody. 

The Peabody siblings grew up in genteel poverty. Nathaniel and Elizabeth Peabody had been schoolteachers when they married; after the nuptials, the couple set aside a parlor in their house as a schoolroom. Mrs. Peabody urged her husband to become a doctor. He became a dentist, who preferred to experiment, write tracts on the care of teeth, and test herbal remedies to attending patients. As a result, his wife's teaching salary became the main financial support of the family.

Growing up in Salem, Massachusetts, Mary Peabody left home at eighteen to teach school in Maine. She moved to Boston to assist her sister Elizabeth in the operation of a school for young children; in their mid-twenties, Elizabeth and Mary moved into a boardinghouse. The home of Rebecca Clarke, the mother of James Freeman Clarke, also became Horace Mann's residence in 1833.  Later that year, Mary accompanied her sickly younger sister Sophia to Cuba; Elizabeth Peabody and Horace Mann shared a sibling-like closeness and intellectual compatibility that flourished in Mary's absence. While in Cuba, Mary worked as a governess to a Cuban family. The letters she exchanged with Elizabeth contained numerous references to Horace Mann.
  
Returning to Boston in spring 1835, Mary moved in with her brother George and found employment tutoring students in Italian. After a short interlude of substituting for Elizabeth at Amos Bronson Alcott’s experimental Temple School, Mary returned to Salem, where she established a successful school for little children in her home and began to write educational works for children and parents. Meanwhile, in 1837 Mann was appointed secretary to the Massachusetts board of education and Mary devoted a great deal of time acting as the underpaid statesman's secretary and assistant. Although the board of education's powers were limited, Mann, with Mary's assistance, shaped public opinion regarding school problems and created public support for increasing the pay of teachers and improving their training through the founding of state normal, or teacher-training, schools. 
 
In addition to teaching and helping Horace Mann, Mary found time to write. Her children's book, The Flower People: Being an Account of the Flowers by Themselves; Illustrated with Plates, was published in 1838. The horticultural guide, a collection of tales about a little girl named Mary who makes the acquaintance, one by one, of common garden plants. These imaginary conversations with crocuses, violets, anemones, and geraniums, proved popular with both children and their parents.

Most biographers agree that Mary was smitten with Horace Mann from the first meeting. In contrast, Mann, grieving over the death of his first wife and financially responsible for his only brother's debts, did not reveal amorous sentiments for Mary for close to a decade. On the first of May, 1843, Horace Mann married Mary Peabody (age 36 years) at the Peabody home in Boston at 11:30 a.m.; at 12:30 p.m. the newlyweds set sail on the Hibernia for Europe.

Marriage

Newlyweds Samuel Gridley Howe and Julia Ward joined the Manns on their extended honeymoon, which featured visits to prisons, reform schools, insane asylums, and institutions for the blind and the deaf.  The trip was part honeymoon and part working holiday for the two reform-minded couples.

The Manns had three children: Horace Mann Jr., born February 25, 1844; George Combe Mann born December 27, 1845; Benjamin Pickman Mann born April 30, 1848.  Horace Mann resigned as secretary of the board of education in 1848 to take the seat of former President John Quincy Adams in the United States Congress. There he proved himself to be a fierce enemy of slavery. In 1853, he accepted the presidency of Antioch College in Yellow Springs, Ohio, a new institution committed to coeducation, non-sectarianism, and equal opportunity for African Americans. Mary Peabody Mann filled the role of president's wife and confidant.

Just as Horace Mann devoted himself to running Antioch College and reforming social ills, Mary, too, joined the ranks of reformers.  Overeating was one of the vices that Mary campaigned to change; her Christianity in the Kitchen: A Physiological Cookbook purported to serve as a moral guide to good eating.  It was the housewife's duty, Mary believed, to educate herself in the latest scientific knowledge in order to keep her family healthy. Citing the research of scientists, she warned her readers against rich and fatty foods and advised moderation in spices and abstinence from alcohol.

Widowhood

Following her husband's death in 1859, Mary and the family returned to Massachusetts. Writing her husband's biography and editing his works helped Mary through her grief.  Life and Works of Horace Mann contains only one reference to Mary: "On 1 May 1843, Mr. Mann was again married, and sailed for Europe to visit European schools, especially in Germany, where he expected to derive most benefit." Less than ten years after she buried her husband, Mary's oldest son, Horace Mann Jr. died at the age of 24 in 1868.

As a widow, Mary also wrote for a variety of periodicals on topics related to education (no matter how obliquely), translated works from the Spanish, supervised the education of her sons, participated actively in philanthropic work, and aided her sister Elizabeth in her kindergarten in Boston. Her essay, "Moral Culture of Infancy," was published in 1863 in a single small volume with Elizabeth Peabody's "Kindergarten Guide:" Moral Culture of Infancy, and Kindergarten Guide: with Music for the Plays.  The collaboration of Mary and Elizabeth included promoting the speaking career of Sarah Winnemucca Hopkins, the first Native American woman known to secure a copyright and to publish in the English language.  In addition, Mary helped Hopkins with her book, Life among the Piutes: Their Wrongs and Claims (1883).

In her eightieth year, Mary began to write her first novel; Juanita: A Romance of Real Life in Cuba Fifty Years Ago (1887) appeared posthumously. Elizabeth Peabody commented, “The story is fiction; but the principal characters and the most important incidents are real—it was this that made the author keep back the book from publication till all were dead….It was the merest accident that the work was not published before my sister’s death, as she so earnestly desired it should be.”

Death
Mary Tyler Peabody Mann died February 11, 1887, in Boston, Massachusetts.

Works

 The Flower People: Being an Account of the Flowers by Themselves; Illustrated with Plates (Boston: Lee and Shepard, 1888, o.p. 1838). 
1875 ed., illustrated by Mrs. G.P. Lathrop
 Christianity in the Kitchen, a Physiological Cook-Book (Boston: Ticknor and Fields, 1857).
 with Elizabeth Palmer Peabody, Moral Culture of Infancy, and Kindergarten Guide: With Music for the Plays (Boston: T.O.H.P. Burnham, 1863).

 Life and Works of Horace Mann (3 vols. 1865-68; extended edition in 5 vols., ed. by G. C. Mann, 1891).
 "New Methods for Improving Domestics." Herald of Health (1869).
 "A Woman's View of Intemperance." Arthur's Lady's Home Magazine (1872).
 Juanita: A Romance of Real Life in Cuba Fifty Years Ago (D. Lothrop Co., 1887).
 A Primer of Reading, Spelling, and Drawing (2.Ed., 1851).

Notes

References

Further reading
 Megan Marshall, The Peabody Sisters: Three Women Who Ignited American Romanticism (Boston: Houghton Mifflin Company, 2005).
 Louise Hall Tharp, Until Victory: Horace Mann and Mary Peabody (Boston: Little, Brown, 1953).
 Louise Hall Tharp, The Peabody Sisters of Salem (Little, Brown and Company: Boston 1950).
 Monika M Elbert, Julie E Hall, and Katharine Rodier, eds., Reinventing the Peabody Sisters (Iowa City: University of Iowa Press, 2006).
 Robert L. Straker, “Thoreau's Journey to Minnesota,” The New England Quarterly 14 (September 1941): 549-555.
 Lura Rogers Seavey, More Than Petticoats: Remarkable Massachusetts Women (The Globe Pequot Press, 2005).

External links
 Portrait of Mary and Benjy
 Portrait of Mary
 The Peabody Sisters Dictionary of Unitarian & Universalist Biography
 Mary Peabody Mann
 Peabody Sisters National Women's history Museum
 Juanita:A Romance of Real Life in Cuba Fifty Years Ago
 
 

1806 births
1887 deaths
People from Yellow Springs, Ohio
19th-century American women writers
19th-century American writers